Hollywood – My Way is a studio album by Nancy Wilson issued in July 1963 on Capitol Records. The album rose to No. 11 on the Billboard 200 chart.

Track listing
 "My Shining Hour" (Harold Arlen, Johnny Mercer) – 1:58
 "Days of Wine and Roses" (Henry Mancini, Mercer) – 3:27
 "Moon River" (Mancini, Mercer) – 2:07
 "Secret Love" (Sammy Fain, Paul Francis Webster) – 3:04
 "Dearly Beloved" (Jerome Kern, Mercer) – 2:13
 "I'll Never Stop Loving You" (Nicholas Brodszky, Sammy Cahn) – 2:39
 "When Did You Leave Heaven" (Walter Bullock, Richard A. Whiting) – 2:55
 "Almost in Your Arms (Love Song from Houseboat)" (Ray Evans, Jay Livingston) – 2:31
 "Wild Is the Wind" (Dimitri Tiomkin, Ned Washington) – 2:50
 "The Second Time Around" (Cahn, Jimmy Van Heusen) – 2:53
 "Did I Remember" (Harold Adamson, Walter Donaldson) – 3:44
 "You'd Be So Nice to Come Home To" (Cole Porter) – 2:36
Bonus tracks on 2006 reissue
 "Alfie" (Burt Bacharach, Hal David) – 3:04
 "The Look of Love" (Bacharach, David) – 2:26
 "More" (Riz Ortolani, Nino Oliviero, Marcello Ciorciolini, Norman Newell) – 3:14
 "The Shadow of Your Smile (Love Theme from The Sandpiper)" (Johnny Mandel, Webster) – 2:01
 "Watch What Happens" (Jacques Demy, Norman Gimbel, Michel Legrand) – 3:04

Personnel
Nancy Wilson – vocals
Jimmy Jones – piano, arrangements, conductor
Clark Terry – trumpet

References

1963 albums
Nancy Wilson (jazz singer) albums
Capitol Records albums